is a Japanese group rhythmic gymnast. She represents her nation at international competitions.

She participated at the 2008 Summer Olympics in Beijing. She also competed at world championships, including at the 2007 and 2009 World Rhythmic Gymnastics Championships.

References

External links

1989 births
Living people
Japanese rhythmic gymnasts
People from Yamagata Prefecture
Sportspeople from Yamagata Prefecture
Gymnasts at the 2008 Summer Olympics
Olympic gymnasts of Japan